Ferrisaurus  is a genus of leptoceratopsid ceratopsian dinosaur from the Sustut Basin (Tango Creek Formation) in British Columbia, Canada. The type and only species is Ferrisaurus sustutensis. It is the first non-avian dinosaur described from British Columbia.

Discovery and naming

It was discovered in 1971 during a uranium and thorium exploration by Kenny F. Larsen and was donated to the Dalhousie University in 2004. It was described but not named in 2008; by then it made its way into the collection of the Royal British Columbia Museum in Victoria. It was named in 2019. The holotype, RBCM P900, nicknamed Buster, includes portions of the pectoral girdles, left forelimb, left hindlimb, and right pes.

The name Ferrisaurus is derived from Latin ferrum (=iron) and Greek sauros (=lizard), referencing to the specimen's discovery along a railway line. The epithet honours the Sustut River and Basin.

See also
 Timeline of ceratopsian research

References

Paleontology in British Columbia
Leptoceratopsids
Maastrichtian life
Late Cretaceous dinosaurs of North America
Fossils of Canada
Cretaceous Canada
Fossil taxa described in 2019
Ornithischian genera
Fossils of British Columbia